Entomoplasmatales is a small order of mollicute bacteria.

The genus Spiroplasma is part of this order.

Phylogeny
The currently accepted taxonomy is based on the List of Prokaryotic names with Standing in Nomenclature (LPSN) and National Center for Biotechnology Information (NCBI)

See also
 List of bacterial orders
 List of bacteria genera

References

Mollicutes